John Bradford Nixon (born June 28, 1949) is a former politician in Ontario, Canada. He served in the Legislative Assembly of Ontario as a Liberal from 1987 to 1990.

Background
Nixon was educated at the University of Toronto, Osgoode Hall Law School and York University. He was a lawyer before entering political life. He is married to Carol Beckmann-Nixon and lives in Niagara-on-the-Lake.

Politics
He was elected to the Ontario legislature in the 1987 provincial election, defeating Progressive Conservative Gordon Chong by over 3,000 votes in the Toronto riding of York Mills. He was a backbench supporter of David Peterson's government for the next three years. He served as parliamentary assistant to the Minister of Financial Institutions in 1987-88, and parliamentary assistant to the Minister of Housing in 1988-89.

The Liberals were defeated by the Ontario New Democratic Party in the 1990 election. Nixon lost his seat to David Turnbull of the Progressive Conservatives by over 2,500 votes.

After politics
Nixon later worked as executive director for the office of the party leader, but left the position in 1992 after Lyn McLeod was elected leader. He prepared a water power brief for the Independent Power Producers' Society of Ontario in 1996.

Since 1992, he has practised law in the fields of property tax and assessment.  He was a partner in the firm of Poole Milligan, and has served on the Ontario chapter of the Canadian Property Tax Association. He then became a partner in the firm of Walker Poole Nixon. When that firm dissolved he became a partner in Nixon Fleet and Poole LLP.

References

External links

1949 births
Lawyers in Ontario
Living people
Ontario Liberal Party MPPs
Politicians from Toronto